Borosil is an Indian glassware company based in Mumbai. The company is one of the largest glassware producing companies in India with a significant presence in USA and The Netherlands.

History
Borosil is the market leader for laboratory glassware and microwavable kitchenware in India. It was established in 1962  in collaboration with Corning Glass Works USA. In 1988, Corning divested its shareholding to the current Indian promoters.

Products 
The company's products include laboratory glassware, instruments, disposable plastics, liquid handling systems and explosion-proof lighting glassware for the education sector and for industries including microbiology, biotechnology, photoprinting, process systems and lighting.

References

External links 
 

Indian brands
Glassmaking companies of India
Manufacturing companies based in Mumbai
Indian companies established in 1962
Companies listed on the Bombay Stock Exchange
Companies listed on the National Stock Exchange of India